Crean Lutheran High School is a private Lutheran high school in Irvine, California. The school was founded in 2007 as Lutheran South High School and had its initial campus at St. Paul's Greek Orthodox Church in the Woodbridge neighborhood of Irvine. In 2010, Crean Lutheran opened its own campus in southeastern Irvine near the Woodbury neighborhood. The school was renamed after John and Donna Crean, local philanthropists who donated  to the school in its first year. 

Crean Lutheran is accredited by the Western Association of Schools and Colleges as well as the National Lutheran Schools Accreditation. The school self-reports that its students test 69% higher than the national average on standardized testing.

Athletics
Crean Lutheran sponsors 26 varsity teams across 15 different sports. The teams compete in the CIF Southern Section in the Empire League division. The school was a member of the Academy League from 2009 until 2017. Crean's girls swimming and diving team won a state title in 2016. The boys basketball team won a CIF Division 3AA state championship in 2018 and a Division 2A state championship in 2021.

References

Educational institutions established in 2007
High schools in Orange County, California
Lutheran schools in California
Private high schools in California
2007 establishments in California
Secondary schools affiliated with the Lutheran Church–Missouri Synod